Kórnica  (German Körnitz) is a village in the administrative district of Gmina Krapkowice, within Krapkowice County, Opole Voivodeship, in south-western Poland.

References

Villages in Krapkowice County